The Parris Island Museum is located at Building 111, Panama Street, Marine Corps Recruit Depot Parris Island in Beaufort, South Carolina, United States. The museum consists of a  facility and includes exhibits of the history of the United States Marine Corps as well as the history of the Port Royal region. Exhibits cover the span of time and occupancy of the island, from Native American civilization and French and Spanish colonies to modern day. Other exhibits display artifacts from the early 19th century to the present day.

History
Commandant of the Marine Corps General Robert E. Cushman, Jr. dedicated the museum on January 8, 1975, in the former War Memorial Building, originally constructed in 1951 as an enlisted recreation center. A year-long renovation of the museum was completed in the spring of 2008.

See also
United States Marine Corps Recruit Training
USS Parris Island (AG-72)

Notes

External links

Parris Island Museum (official website of museum)
MCRD PI (official website of Marine Corps Recruit Depot Parris Island)
Marines (official website of the U. S. Marines)

History museums in South Carolina
Marine Corps museums in the United States
Military and war museums in South Carolina
Museums established in 1975
Museums in Beaufort County, South Carolina